Basketball contests at the 2013 Southeast Asian Games were held from 8 December to 16 December 2013. This edition of the tournament featured both men's and women's tournaments. All matches took place at Zayyar Thiri Indoor Stadium in Naypyidaw.

Both men's and women's tournaments were in a round robin format; the team with the best record wins the gold medal. With a game to spare, the Philippines successfully defended the title for the men's competition. Thailand also defended their title as they win the women's division.

Setting
All games took place at the Zayyar Thiri Indoor Stadium (near Zayarthiri Stadium) located in Naypyidaw. The stadium's capacity is about 3,000 with a dimension of 91,809 square feet.

Competition format
*The team has less than two players available to play on the court.**A team cannot present five players at the start of the game, or its actions prevent play from being resumed.
In case teams are tied on points, the tiebreaking criteria are, in order of first application:
 Results of the games involving the tied teams (head-to-head records)
 Goal average of the games involving the tied teams
 Goal average of all of the games played
 Points scored
 Drawing of lots

Men's tournament

Women's tournament

Medal summary

Medal tally

Medal winners

References

 
Southeast Asian Games
2013
2013 Southeast Asian Games events
International basketball competitions hosted by Myanmar